Khashuri is a town in the central part of Georgia and is the 9th largest settlement in Georgia. It is the administrative centre of Khashuri Municipality.

Khashuri is first mentioned in a 1693 document. Modern Khashuri was founded in 1872 as a modest railway stop called "Mikhaylovo" after Grand Duke Michael Nikolaevich of Russia, Viceroy of the Caucasus. In 1917, it was renamed Khashuri. The town was granted city status in 1921. It was known as Stalinisi, after Joseph Stalin, from 1928 to 1934. In the 19th century after the leading Tbilisi-Poti main line, Khashuri gradually became a major transportation node. The railways and highways were heading towards Borjomi and Akhaltsikhe. It was declared a town in 1921. The population of the town is 26,135 (2014). There is rail transport, glass container, food industry enterprises, educational and cultural institutions (public theatre, a museum of local lore). The 18th-century tower, St. John and St. Marine's churches are preserved in the town. There are the Urbnisi and Ruisi Diocese pulpit and residence in Khasuri.

See also
 Shida Kartli

References

External links
 Khashuri.org.ge
 

Cities and towns in Shida Kartli
Tiflis Governorate